Austroglyptolenus is a genus of beetles in the family Carabidae, containing the following species:

 Austroglyptolenus mendozensis Roig-Junient, 2003
 Austroglyptolenus precordillerae Roig-Junient, 2003

References

Platyninae